Savastano is a surname. Notable people with the surname include:

Mariano Savastano (born 1964), Italian prefectural commissioner
Mauro Savastano (born 1997), Dutch footballer
 (born 1991), Italian opera singer

Italian-language surnames